Denis Trudel  (born July 18, 1963) is an actor and a politician from Quebec, Canada. He was elected to the House of Commons of Canada in the 2019 election in the district of Longueuil—Saint-Hubert as a member of the Bloc Québécois.

Electoral record

Filmography

Cinema 

 1987 : Le Diable à quatre
 1989 : How to Make Love to a Negro Without Getting Tired (Comment faire l’amour avec un nègre sans se fatiguer) : pusher #3
 1990 : The Party (Le Party) : nurse
 1994 : Octobre : felquist
 1998 : 2 Seconds (2 secondes) : buyer
 2000 : The Left-Hand Side of the Fridge (La Moitié gauche du frigo) : worker #2 DNR Systems
 2001 : February 15, 1839 (15 février 1839) : Jacques Yelle
 2001 : Tar Angel (L'Ange de goudron)
 2002 : Savage Messiah (Moïse : L'Affaire Roch Thériault) : Alphonse
 2002 : S.P.C.E. : policeman
 2003 : Les Immortels : Denis
 2004 : Happy Camper (Camping sauvage) : Richard
 2005 : C.R.A.Z.Y. : uncle Georges
 2005 : Audition (L'Audition) : father in the parc
 2007 : La Lâcheté : Conrad Tremblay
 2007 : Bluff : police officer
 2008 : Le Déserteur : Georges Larochelle
 2009 : The Timekeeper (L'Heure de vérité)
 2011 : La Vérité : Denis
 2012 : Ésimésac : Hubert

Television 

 1993 : Les grands procès : Jean-Marie Ruest
 1997 : Cher Olivier  : Gilles Latulippe
 1998 : Réseaux : Raoul Simard
 1998 : Mais où se cache Carmen Sandiego ? 
 2000 : Chartrand et Simonne : Joachim Cornellier
 2001 : La Vie, la vie : Didier
 2002 : Fortier : Denis Laflamme
 2002 : Tag - Épilogue : Xavier
 2002 : Tabou : Mathias
 2002 : Lance et compte : Nouvelle Génération : journalist
 2002 : Bunker, le cirque : Yvon Gagné
 2003-2005 : Watatatow : Éric Bouliane
 2004 : Smash : Gilles Jetté
 2005 : Au nom de la loi : Guimond
 2006 : Casino : Albert Tremblay
 2007 : Destinées : Gaétan Pellerin
 2011-2015 : 19-2 : Belinski
 2017-2019 : Victor Lessard : Paul Delaney
 2019 : La Faille : Robert Fournier

References

External links

1963 births
Male actors from Quebec
Bloc Québécois MPs
Members of the House of Commons of Canada from Quebec
21st-century Canadian politicians
Living people
People from Longueuil